Azimut Yachts is an Italian yacht-manufacturing company based in Viareggio, Italy. It was established in 1969 by Paolo Vitelli.

The company began by chartering sailboats, later developing into a large luxury yacht building industry.  The first major work started with a contract at the ship-yard of Amerglass, a modern Dutch shipyard producing boats in fibreglass. The business developed quickly, adding the distribution of sailing boats, motorcruisers and finally motoryachts from different makers: British Powles, Westerly, and others.

The company currently owns Benetti, another luxury ship building company.

Atlantis (boat builder) was acquired before 2013 and continued producing for the Atlantis brand for years, but in 2013 Azimut Atlantis models were on offer.

History 
Azimut Yachts started in 1969, when Paolo Vitelli founded Azimut Srl and started chartering sailboats.

In 1970, the 'Amerglass' brand of yachts chose the company to distribute their boats in Italy.

From 1979, Azimut expanded its activities: in addition to distribution, it began to design new yachts. As part of a joint venture with Amerglass, she designed the AZ 43' Bali, a mass-produced fiberglass boat. The company expands its range by focusing on the lower segment of the market - with the launch of the AZ 32' Targa in 1977, the "Ford T" of the boating world - and high end - with the launch of the Azimut 105' Failaka in 1982. 

In 1985, Azimut acquired Benetti. This historic brand, based in Viareggio, has been manufacturing boats since 1873 and designs the concept of the mega-yacht. 

From the end of the 1990s, with the acquisition of new shipyards in Fano, the restructuring of the Benetti shipyard in Viareggio and the construction of a new shipyard in Avigliana, in the province of Turin.

Ship building
The headquarters site houses is a 100,000 square meter facility of offices and the factory, which can build 300 boats (of up to  LOA) per year. Larger yachts are ordered from other, larger ship-yards in the world.

Charter
The company was established for boat chartering and continues to provide this service.

See also

 Baglietto
 Benetti
 Codecasa
 Fincantieri
 Rossinavi
 Sanlorenzo

References

External links

 Official website

Yacht building companies
Italian boat builders
Shipbuilding companies of Italy
Companies based in Turin
Vehicle manufacturing companies established in 1969
Italian companies established in 1969
Italian brands